The Theatre Chipping Norton, sometimes The Theatre, Chipping Norton, is a theatre, cinema, gallery and music venue in Chipping Norton, Oxfordshire, England.

The main auditorium was originally a Salvation Army citadel, built in 1888. After some years as a furniture warehouse it was rediscovered in 1968; fundraising began in 1973, the theatre was registered as a charity in 1974, and it opened as a theatre in 1975. It acquired adjoining properties to provide space for bar, gallery, green rooms, offices and rehearsal space, and underwent a major refurbishment in 1996 with Arts Council England assistance.

The theatre produces original shows and hosts touring companies; in 2016 it co-produced with The Dukes a 20th-anniversary touring production of Stones in His Pockets. It prides itself on its annual "world-renowned traditional family pantomime".

References

External links

Theatres in Oxfordshire
Arts organizations established in 1973
Former churches in Oxfordshire
Former Salvation Army citadels
Chipping Norton